Locheilside railway station is a railway station on the northern shore of Loch Eil in the Highland Council Area of Scotland. ScotRail, who manage the station, operate all services.

History 
Locheilside station opened on 1 April 1901.

The station was host to a LNER camping coach from 1936 to 1939.

20-year-old Norman Ahmed was last seen alighting from a train at the station on 27 August 2022 and was reported missing. However, he was later found safe and well.

Facilities 

The station has a shelter, a bench, a help point and cycle racks, adjacent to a small car park. The station has step-free access. As there are no facilities to purchase tickets, passengers must buy one in advance, or from the guard on the train.

Passenger volume 

The statistics cover twelve month periods that start in April.

Services 
Four services call here each way on weekdays & Saturdays, and three each way on Sundays.

References

Bibliography

External links

 RAILSCOT on Mallaig Extension Railway

Railway stations in Highland (council area)
Railway stations served by ScotRail
Railway request stops in Great Britain
Railway stations in Great Britain opened in 1901
Former North British Railway stations
Low usage railway stations in the United Kingdom